Abdel Wahab Abdullah Salih (born 1946) is a Sudanese boxer. He competed in the 1968 and 1972 Summer Olympics.

References

1946 births
Living people
Boxers at the 1968 Summer Olympics
Boxers at the 1972 Summer Olympics
Sudanese male boxers
Olympic boxers of Sudan
People from Khartoum
Middleweight boxers
Light-middleweight boxers